Genola is a town in Utah County, Utah, United States. It is part of the Provo–Orem Metropolitan Statistical Area. The population was 1,370 at the 2010 census.

Geography

The town is located in the northeast Goshen Valley; Santaquin is adjacent to the southeast. The former area of Townsend is located within the southeast area of Genola.

Demographics

As of the census of 2000, there were 965 people, 224 households, and 196 families residing in the town. The population density was 75.7 people per square mile (29.2/km2). There were 242 housing units at an average density of 19.0 per square mile (7.3/km2). The racial makeup of the town was 92.54% White, 0.73% Native American, 0.41% Asian, 5.39% from other races, and 0.93% from two or more races. Hispanic or Latino of any race were 8.08% of the population.

There were 224 households, out of which 59.4% had children under 18 living with them, 79.9% were married couples living together, 6.3% had a female householder with no husband present, and 12.1% were non-families. 11.2% of all households were made up of individuals, and 7.6% had someone living alone who was 65 years of age or older. The average household size was 4.18, and the average family size was 4.55.

In the town, the population was spread out, with 44.4% under 18, 9.0% from 18 to 24, 21.6% from 25 to 44, 16.9% from 45 to 64, and 8.2% who were 65 years of age or older. The median age was 22 years. For every 100 females, there were 115.9 males. For every 100 females aged 18 and over, there were 115.7 males.

The median income for a household in the town was $45,417, and the median income for a family was $50,125. Males had a median income of $31,563 versus $25,833 for females. The per capita income for the town was $13,484. About 4.4% of families and 9.9% of the population were below the poverty line, including 12.1% of those under age 18 and 2.5% of those aged 65 or over.

See also
 Tintic Standard Reduction Mill

References

External links

 Town of Genola (official website)

 
Towns in Utah
Provo–Orem metropolitan area
Populated places established in 1935
Towns in Utah County, Utah